Bridgeport High School is public institution located at 4961 Bearcat Blvd. in Bridgeport, Michigan. Bridgeport's mascot is a bearcat, and its colors are yellow and red.

References

External links
 

Public high schools in Michigan
Schools in Saginaw County, Michigan
Saginaw Intermediate School District
1961 establishments in Michigan